The following is a list of the mayors of Des Moines, Iowa.

List of mayors

See also
Des Moines City Council

Notes

Works cited

References

Des Moines